Amphipetalum is a genus of flowering plants belonging to the family Talinaceae.

Its native range is Bolivia to Paraguay.

Species:

Amphipetalum paraguayense

References

Caryophyllales
Caryophyllales genera